The following is a list of deprecated terms for diseases.

References

External links
Rudy's List of Archaic Medical Terms